The florin was the currency of Lombardy-Venetia (reduced to the sole Venetia three years before) between 1862 and 1866. It replaced the lira at a rate of 1 florin = 3 lire. The florin was equivalent to the Austro-Hungarian florin. Although it was subdivided into 100 soldi rather than 100 kreutzers, Austrian coins circulated in Venetia. The only coins issued specifically for Venetia were copper  and 1 soldo pieces. The name soldo was chosen due to the equivalence of the predecimal kreutzer and soldo, both worth  of a Conventionsthaler.

The florin was replaced by the Italian lira at the rate of 1 lira =  soldi (1 florin = 2.469 lire). This rate corresponded to the comparative silver contents of the lira and florin coins.

References

External links
 

Obsolete Italian currencies
1862 establishments in the Austrian Empire
1866 disestablishments
19th-century economic history
19th century in Italy
History of Lombardy
History of Venice
Kingdom of Lombardy–Venetia